Das Boot is a 1981 German war film and 1985 TV mini series based on Lothar-Günther Buchheim's eponymous 1973 book. Das Boot is German for "The Boat".

Das Boot may also refer to:

 Das Boot (novel), the source novel by Lothar-Günther Buchheim from 1973
 "Das Boot" (song), title theme to the film, composed and produced by Klaus Doldinger; 1991 covered by U96
 Das Boot (TV series), a German television series sequel to the 1981 film and 1985 series
 Das Boot (album), a 1992 album by U96 from 1992
 Das Boot (video game), a 1991 video game inspired by the novel of the same name
 A plot device in the 2006 comedy movie Beerfest

See also 
 "Dos Boot", an episode of Dexter's Laboratory
 "Das Bus", an episode of The Simpsons
 "Das Boob", an episode of Will & Grace
The Boat (disambiguation)